James Little (22 October 1834–31 October 1921) was a New Zealand shepherd and sheep breeder. He was born in Powbeat, Midlothian, Scotland on 22 October 1834.

References

1834 births
1921 deaths
Shepherds
People from Midlothian
Scottish emigrants to New Zealand